Dilip may refer to:

People
 Dilīpa, king in Hindu mythology
 Dilip Chhabria, Indian automobile designer
 Dilip Chitre (1938–2009), Indian writer and critic
 Dilip D'Souza (born 1960), Indian writer and journalist
 Dilip Dholakia (1921–2011), often credited as D. Dilip or Dilip Roy, an Indian music composer and singer
 Dilip Doshi (born 1947), former Indian cricketer
 Dilip Hiro, playwright and analyst specializing in India and the Islamic world
 Dilip Jajodia (born 1944), Indian businessman
 Dilip Joshi (born 1968), Indian film and television actor
 Dilip Kumar (1922–2021), Indian actor, also known as Mohammed Yousef Khan
 Dilip Kumar Chakrabarti (born 1941), archaeologist and professor of South Asian archaeology at Cambridge University
 Dilip Mahalanabis (born 1934), Indian pediatrician
 Dilip P. Gaonkar (born 1945), associate professor of communication studies at Northwestern University
 Dilip Prabhavalkar (born 1944), Indian Marathi film and television actor
 Dilip Ray (born 1954), Indian politician and hotelier
 Dilip Rayamajhi (born 1976), Nepali actor
 Dilip Roy (disambiguation), several
 Dilip Sardesai (1940–2007), Indian test cricketer
 Dilip Sarkar (Tripura politician) (?–2019),  Indian politician
 Dalip Tahil (born 1952), Indian film, television and theatre actor
 Dilip Tirkey (born 1977), Indian hockey player
 Dilip Vengsarkar (born 1956), Indian cricketer
 Dilip Wagh, politician
 Dilip Wedaarachchi (born 1957), Sri Lankan politician
 R. Dilip (Tamil actor) (1950s–2012), Indian actor

Other uses
 Mons Dilip, location on the Moon

See also 
 Dileep (disambiguation)